The 1956–57 Liga Alef season saw Hapoel Kfar Saba win the title. originally, the top two clubs were due to gain promotion to Liga Leumit. However, due to irregularities during the season, an IFA committee decided to hold a promotion play-off between the top five clubs at the end of the season.

Final table

Promotion play-offs
Each team played the other four once at a neutral venue. The top two clubs were to be promoted and the third would play a promotion/relegation play-off against the bottom club at Liga Leumit, which was Maccabi Jaffa.

Matches were played initially during September, but Maccabi Rehovot, who had finished the season in the second place and had expected to be promoted, declined to participate and appealed the committee's decision. The results of Rehovot's matches were initially recorded as 0-3 technical losses. However, after their appeal was rejected, the club were allowed to replay their matches.

Hapoel Kfar Saba and Hapoel Jerusalem were promoted to Liga Leumit. Hapoel Hadera and Hakoah Tel Aviv were due to play a deciding match to set who will play against Maccabi Jaffa, but Hapoel Hadera declined to participate in protest at the IFA's decision to allow Maccabi Rehovot to replay their games.

Promotion and relegation play-offs

References
Liga Alef final table Heruth, 19.5.57, Historical Jewish Press 

Liga Alef seasons
Israel
2